Latastia  doriai, also known commonly as Doria's long-tailed lizard, is a species of lizard in the family Lacertidae. The species is endemic to the Horn of Africa. There are three recognized subspecies.

Geographic range
L. doriai is found in Djibuti, Eritrea, Ethiopia, and Somalia.

Habitat

Subspecies
Including the nominotypical subspecies, three subspecies are recognized as being valid.
Latastia doriai doriai 
Latastia doriai martensi 
Latastia doriai scortecci

Etymology
The specific name, doriai, is in honor of Italian zoologist Giacomo Doria.

The subspecific name, martensi, is in honor of German zoologist Eduard von Martens.

The subspecific name, scorteccii, is in honor of Italian herpetologist Giuseppe Scortecci.

Reproduction
L. doriai is oviparous.

References

Further reading
Arillo A, Balletto E, Spanò S (1967). "Il genere Latastia Bedriaga in Somalia". Bollettino dei Musei e degli Istituti Biologici dell'Università di Genova 35: 105–145. (Latastia doriai scorteccii, new subspecies, p. 140). (in Italian).
Bedriaga J (1884). "Die neue Lacertiden-Gattung Latastia und ihre Arten ". Annali del Museo Civico di Storia Naturale Giacomo Doria 20 307–324. (Latastia doriai, new species, pp. 313–316; L. d. var. martensi, new variety, pp. 316–319). (in German).
Lanza B (1990). "Amphibians and reptiles of the Somali Democratic Republic: check list and biogeography". Biogeographia 14: 407–465.
Largen M, Spawls S (2010). Amphibians and Reptiles of Ethiopia and Eritrea. Frankfurt am Main, Germany: Chimaira / Serpents Tale. 687 pp. . (Latastia doriai, p. 354).

Reptiles described in 1884
Latastia
Taxa named by Jacques von Bedriaga